Donna McGinnis (born September 23, 1968) is a former competitive swimmer who represented Canada at the 1984 Summer Olympics and 1988 Summer Olympics.  Her best Olympic finish was sixth place in the 400-metre individual medley in Los Angeles, California.  McGinnis won the 200-metre butterfly at the 1986 Commonwealth Games in Edinburgh, Scotland.

References

External links
 
 
 
 

1968 births
Living people
Canadian female butterfly swimmers
Canadian female freestyle swimmers
Canadian female medley swimmers
Olympic swimmers of Canada
Swimmers from Edmonton
Swimmers at the 1983 Pan American Games
Swimmers at the 1986 Commonwealth Games
Swimmers at the 1984 Summer Olympics
Swimmers at the 1988 Summer Olympics
Commonwealth Games medallists in swimming
Commonwealth Games gold medallists for Canada
Commonwealth Games silver medallists for Canada
Commonwealth Games bronze medallists for Canada
Pan American Games competitors for Canada
20th-century Canadian women
Medallists at the 1986 Commonwealth Games